Events in the year 2010 in Germany.

Incumbents

Federal level
 President:
Horst Köhler (until 31 May 2010) 
Jens Böhrnsen (Acting; 31 May – 30 June 2010) 
Christian Wulff (from 30 June 2010) 
 Chancellor: Angela Merkel

Events

 16 January – The German government asks its citizens to stop using Microsoft's web browser Internet Explorer to protect their own security.
 22 January – A Nuremberg court issues an arrest warrant for former Argentine leader Jorge Rafael Videla, on suspicion of killing a German man.
 11–21 February – 60th Berlin International Film Festival
 13 February – More than 10,000 anti-fascist protesters successfully block a planned neo-Nazi march in Dresden.
 4 April – Three car bombs hit the Egyptian, German and Iranian embassies in the centre of the Iraqi capital, Baghdad, in quick succession, killing at least 30 people.
 29 May – With the song "Satellite", Germany's Lena wins the Eurovision Song Contest 2010, the first German victory since 1982.
 25 June – Germany's TanDEM-X satellite, whose aim it is to create the most precise 3D map of Earth's surface, obtains its first images.
 30 June — Christian Wulff is elected President of Germany.
 4 July – In a referendum, voters in the German state of Bavaria vote to ban smoking at all pubs and restaurants.
 7 July – Spain defeats Germany 1–0 to win its semi-final and for its first time, along with Netherlands make the 2010 FIFA World Cup Final.
 10 July – 2010 FIFA World Cup: Germany defeats Uruguay 3–2 to finish third.
 12 July – At least eight people are injured after a tornado strikes the German island of Duene in the North Sea.
 24 July – A massive stampede at the 2010 Love Parade in Duisburg kills 20 people and injures dozens more people.
 8 August  – Dutch rider Ellen van Dijk wins the 2010 Sparkassen Giro.
 26 August – German HIV-positive pop singer Nadja Benaissa is found guilty of grievous bodily harm after transmitting HIV to a man who had unprotected sex with her without her telling him of her condition.
 21–26 September – photokina in Cologne
 3 October – 
 Germany celebrates 20 years of unification. 
 The German government pays its last World War I reparations.
 26 October – The number of unemployed in Germany drops first time since 1991 below three million.
 1 November – German identity cards are issued in the ISO/IEC 7810 ID-1 format and contain RFID chips with personally identifiable information including a biometric Photo and, if desired, two fingerprints.

 9 November – Demonstrations in Wendland near Gorleben against CASTOR-transport.
 29 November – Break of coalition in Hamburg between the Green and CDU parties.
 December – The German Meteorological Service, says December was the coldest December month since 1969 in Germany.

Deaths

January 
 1 January – Marlene Neubauer-Woerner, 91, German sculptor. (born 1918)
 1 January – Freya von Moltke, 98, German World War II resistance fighter. (born 1911)
 4 January – Ludwig Wilding, 82, German artist. (born 1927)
 9 January – Franz-Hermann Brüner, 64, German head of OLAF, after long illness. (born 1945)
 9 January – Diether Posser, 87, German politician. (born 1922)
 14 January – Katharina Rutschky, 68, German educationalist and author. (born 1941)
 14 January – Petra Schürmann, 74, German television presenter, Miss World 1956, after long illness. (born 1933)
 15 January – Detlev Lauscher, 57, German footballer. (born 1952)
 18 January – Günter Mielke, 67, German Olympic athlete. (born 1942)
 30 January – Ruth Cohn, 97, German psychotherapist. (born 1912)
 31 January – Erna Baumbauer, 91, German casting agent. (born 1919)

February 
 10 February – Michael Palme, 66, German sportswriter and host. (born 1943)
 12 February – Werner Krämer, 70, German footballer. (born 1940)
 14 February – Rosa Rein, 112, German-born Swiss supercentenarian. (born 1897)
 16 February – Ino Kolbe, 95, German Esperanto expert. (born 1914)
 17 February – Ines Paulke, 51, German rock and roll singer and songwriter, suicide. (born 1958)
 18 February – Erwin Bachmann, 88, German Waffen-SS officer. (born 1921)
 23 February – Gerhardt Neef, 63, German footballer (Rangers), throat cancer. (born 1946)
 23 February – Henri Salmide, 90, German World War II naval officer, saved Bordeaux port from destruction. (born 1919)
 27 February – David Bankier, 63, German-born Israeli Holocaust scholar. (born 1947)

March 
 5 March – Wolfgang Schenck, 97, German airman, Luftwaffe flying ace. (born 1913)
 12 March – Hanna-Renate Laurien, 81, German politician. (born 1928)
 14 March – Konrad Ruhland, 78, German musicologist. (born 1932)
 20 March – Erwin Lehn, 90, German musician and conductor. (born 1919)
 21 March – Wolfgang Wagner, 90, German director (Bayreuth Festival), natural causes. (born 1919)
 22 March – Emil Schulz, 71, German boxer. (born 1938)
 25 March – Elisabeth Noelle-Neumann, 93, German political scientist. (born 1916)
 27 March – Peter Herbolzheimer, 74, German jazz musician (born 1935)
 30 March – Alfred Ambs, 87, German World War II flying ace. (born 1923)
 30 March – Josef Homeyer, 80, German Roman Catholic prelate, Bishop of Hildesheim (1983–2004). (born 1983)
 30 March – Martin Sandberger, 98, German Nazi leader and Holocaust perpetrator. (born 1911)
 31 March - Ludwig Martin, German lawyer (born 1909)

April 
 3 April – Ferdinand Simoneit, 84, German journalist, author and World War II veteran. (born 1925)
 4 April – Friedrich Wilhelm Schäfke, 87, German mathematician and academic. (born 1922)
 4 April – Erich Zenger, 70, German Roman Catholic theologian and bible scholar. (born 1939)
 5 April – Günther C. Kirchberger, 81, German academic and painter. (born 1928)
 5 April – Gisela Trowe, 86, German actress. (born 1922)
 6 April – Hans Schröder, 79, German sculptor and painter. (born 1931)
 8 April – Andreas Kunze, 57, German actor, heart failure. (born 1952)
 9 April – Gisela Karau, 78, German author, editor and columnist, after long illness. (born 1932)
 10 April – Martin Ostwald, 88, German-born American classics scholar. (born 1922)
 10 April – Manfred Reichert, 69, German footballer, after long illness. (born 1940)
 11 April – Gerhard Geise, 80, German mathematician, after long illness. (born 1930)
 11 April – Hans-Joachim Göring, 86, German footballer and coach. (born 1923)
 11 April – Gert Haller, 65, German business manager, lobbyist and politician, after long illness. (born 1944)
 11 April – Theodor Homann, 61, German footballer, heart failure. (born 1948)
 11 April – Egon Hugenschmidt, 84, German jurist and politician. (born 1925)
 12 April – Ambrosius Eßer, 76, German Dominican clergy and church historian, pulmonary disease. (born 1933)
 12 April – Wolfgang Graßl, 40, German skier and coach, heart failure. (born 1970)
 12 April – Werner Schroeter, 65, German film director, after long illness. (born 1945)
 14 April – Stefan Schmitt, 46, German jurist and politician, leukemia. (born 1963)
 15 April – Wilhelm Huxhorn, 54, German footballer, leukemia. (born 1955)
 17 April – Josef W. Janker, 87, German author, journalist and World War II veteran. (born 1922)
 21 April – Manfred Kallenbach, 68, German footballer, heart failure. (born 1942)
 24 April – Leo Löwenstein, 43, German racing driver, race accident. (born 1966)
 24 April – Paul Schäfer, 88, German religious sect founder and former Nazi army corporal, heart failure. (born 1921)
 30 April – Paul Mayer, 98, German Roman Catholic prelate and cardinal. (born 1911)

May 
 3 May – Stefan Doernberg, 85, German writer and teacher. (born 1924)
 3 May – Guenter Wendt, 85, German-born American spacecraft engineer (NASA ), heart failure and stroke. (born 1923)
 4 May – Freddy Kottulinsky, 77, German-born Swedish racing driver (born 1932)
 5 May – Alfons Kontarsky, 77, German pianist. (born 1931)
 8 May – Peer Schmidt, 84, German actor, after long illness. (born 1926)
 9 May – Karl-Heinz Schnibbe, 86, German partisan, World War II resistance fighter. (born 1924)
 12 May – Dieter Bock, 71, German businessman and multimillionaire, choking. (born 1938)
 12 May – Edith Keller-Herrmann, 88, German chess Grandmaster. (born 1921)
 13 May – Walter Klimmek, 91, German footballer. (born 1919)
 13 May – Klaus Kotter, 75, German bobsleigh official. (born 1934)
 15 May – Christian Habicht, 57, German actor, heart attack. (born 1952)
 17 May – Ludwig von Friedeburg, 85, German politician and sociologist, Hesse Minister for Education (1969–1974). (born 1924)
 17 May – Fritz Sennheiser, 98, German electrical engineer and entrepreneur, founder of Sennheiser. (born 1912)
 23 May – Eva Ostwalt, 108, German-born American Holocaust survivor. (born 1902)
 24 May – Anneliese Rothenberger, 83, German opera singer. (born 1919)
 29 May – Paul Müller, 69, German biologist. (born 1940)

June 
 10 June – Sigmar Polke, 69, German painter and photographer, cancer. (born 1941)
 12 June – Daisy D'ora, 97, German actress and socialite. (born 1913)
 13 June – Ernest Fleischmann, 85, German-born American impresario, executive director of the Los Angeles Philharmonic. (born 1924)
 15 June – Heidi Kabel, 95, German stage actress. (born 1914)
 18 June – Hans Joachim Sewering, 94, German physician, member of the Waffen SS (1933–1945). (born 1916)
 19 June – Ursula Thiess, 86, German artist and actress (Bengal Brigade). (born 1924)
 21 June – Wilfried Feldenkirchen, 62, German economic historian and project manager (Siemens), car crash. (born 1947)
 22 June – Marie-Luise Jahn, 92, German activist, member of the anti-Nazi resistance movement White Rose. (born 1918)
 22 June – Manfred Römbell, 68, German writer, after long illness. (born 1941)
 23 June – Jörg Berger, 65, German football manager, bowel cancer. (born 1944)
 23 June – Frank Giering, 38, German actor (Funny Games). (born 1971)
 28 June – Willie Huber, 52, German-born Canadian ice hockey player (Detroit Red Wings), heart attack. (born 1958)

July 
 2 July – Carl Adam Petri, 83, German computer scientist. (born 1926)
 3 July – Kirsten Heisig, 48, German politician and juvenile magistrate, suicide. (body discovered on this date) (born 1961)
 3 July – Herbert Erhardt, 79, German footballer, FIFA World Cup winner 1954 (born 1930)
 12 July – Günter Behnisch, 88, German architect. (born 1922)
 22 July – Herbert Giersch, 89, German economist. (born 1921)
 24 July – Theo Albrecht, 88, German entrepreneur and billionaire (Aldi Nord, Trader Joe's). (born 1922)
 25 July – Erich Steidtmann, 95, German Nazi SS officer. (born 1914)
 30 July – Otto Joachim, 99, German-born Canadian violist and composer of electronic music. (born 1910)

August 
 5 August – Jürgen Oesten, 96, German U-boat commander during World War II. (born 1913)
 7 August – Jürgen Thimme, 92, German archaeologist and U-boat commander, after long illness. (born 1917)
 8 August – Bernhard Philberth, 83, German physicist, engineer, philosopher and theologian. (born 1927)
 11 August – Bruno Schleinstein, 78, German actor. (born 1932)
 12 August - Manfred Homberg, German boxer (born 1933)
 18 August – Maria Wachter, 100, German communist and resistance fighter, member of VVN. (born 1910)
 18 August – Sepp Daxenberger, 48, German politician, bone marrow cancer. (born 1962)
 19 August – Gerhard Beil, 84, East German politician. (born 1926)
 21 August – Christoph Schlingensief, 49, German film and theatre director, lung cancer. (born 1960)
 26 August – Walter Wolfrum, 87, German World War II Luftwaffe fighter ace. (born 1923)

September 

 7 September – Eberhard von Brauchitsch, 83, German industrial manager (born 1926)
 11 September – Baerbel Bohley, 65, East German opposition figure & artist (born 1945)
 16 September – Friedrich Wilhelm, Prince of Hohenzollern, 86, German nobleman (born 1924)
 18 September – Egon Klepsch, 80, German politician (born 1930)

October 

 14 October – Hermann Scheer, 66, German politician (born 1944)
 21 October – Loki Schmidt, 91, German environmentalist and wife of Helmut Schmidt. (born 1919)

November 

 5 November – Hajo Herrmann, 97, German Luftwaffe pilot (born 1913)
 6 November – Ezard Haußmann, 75, German actor (born 1935)
 15 November – Andreas Kirchner, 57, German Winter sportsman (born 1953)
 20 November:
 Walter Helmut Fritz, German author (born 1929)
 Heinz Weiss, German actor (born 1921)
 26 November – Maria Hellwig, 90, German singer (born 1920)
 30 November – Peter Hofmann, 76, German singer (born 1944)

December 

 7 December – Armin Weiss, 83, chemist and politician (born 1927)
 7 December – Arnold Weiss, 86, German-born American soldier (born 1924)
 15 December – Hans-Joachim Rauschenbach, 87, German sport journalist (born 1923)
 17 December – Mikhail Umansky, 58, Russian-born German chess grandmaster (born 1952)
 20 December - Katharina Szelinski-Singer, 92, German sculptor (born 1918)

See also
 2010 in German television
 Germany at the 2010 Winter Olympics

References

 
Years of the 21st century in Germany
Germany